Kogelberg Sandstone Fynbos is a critically endangered vegetation type occurring in the far south of the Western Cape, South Africa.

This type of mountain fynbos contains an extremely high number of threatened species and a great number of the plants that occur here can be found nowhere else on earth. It naturally occurs from the eastern outskirts of Cape Town, eastwards through the Kogelberg and Hottentots-Holland mountains, as far as Kleinmond, and it is conserved within the Kogelberg Biosphere Reserve.

This particular vegetation grows on rough, mountainous, sandstone terrain.
It was extensively planted with commercial timber plantations of invasive pine trees. These trees pose a major threat to the unique and endangered biodiversity and have yet to be completely removed.

See also
 Biodiversity of Cape Town
 Cape Floristic Region
 Kogelberg Mountains
 Kogelberg Nature Reserve
 Peninsula Sandstone Fynbos
 :Category:Fynbos - habitats and species.

References

External links
 IUCN Red List.org: Threatened Ecosystems in South Africa: Descriptions and Maps  — Kogelberg Sandstone Fynbos pg. 58−59.

Fynbos ecosystems
Mediterranean forests, woodlands, and scrub in South Africa
Vegetation types of Cape Town